The men's épée was one of four fencing events on the Fencing at the 1908 Summer Olympics programme. The competition was held from 17 to 24 July 1908 at the Franco-British Exhibition fencing grounds. There were 85 competitors from 13 nations. Each nation could enter up to 12 fencers. The medals were swept by the French fencers, who also took the gold medal in the team épée event. Gaston Alibert was the gold medalist, with Alexandre Lippmann taking silver and Eugene Olivier bronze. Officially, it was the second consecutive medal sweep in the event, though two of the three "Cuban" fencers who medaled in 1904 were actually American.

Background

This was the third appearance of the event, which was not held at the first Games in 1896 (with only foil and sabre events held) but has been held at every Summer Olympics since 1900.

None of the five fencers from 1904 returned.

Bohemia, Canada, Denmark, Hungary, the Netherlands, Norway, South Africa, and Sweden each made their debut in the event. Belgium, France, Germany, Great Britain, and Italy each appeared for the second time, matching Cuba and the United States (both absent for the first time) for most among nations.

Competition format

The competition was held over four rounds. In each round, each pool held a round-robin, with bouts to 1 touch. Double-touches counted as touches against both fencers. Barrages were used as necessary to determine the advancing fencers.
 First round: 13 pools of between 5 to 8 fencers each. The 3 fencers in each pool with the fewest touches against advanced to the second round. 
 Second round: 8 pools of 5 fencers each (except one had only 4). The 2 fencers in each pool with the fewest touches against advanced to the semifinals. 
 Semifinals: 2 pools of 8 fencers each. The 4 fencers in each pool with the fewest touches against advanced to the final.
 Final: 1 pool of 8 fencers.

Schedule

Results

First round

The first round was conducted in round-robin format, to one touch. Pool sizes ranged from 5 to 8 fencers. Double-touches counted against both fencers. The three contestants who had been struck the fewest times advanced.

Pool A

Fildes and von Rosen had a double-touch, as did Stöhr and Fildes.

Pool B

Double-touches were between Gates and van Schreven, Jack and Gates, and Collignon and van Schreven.

Pool C

Blake and Dwinger had the only double-touch in this six-man pool.

Pool D

The fourth pool had 8 fencers. Berger was clearly the best of the crowd, going untouched in his seven bouts. When five different fencers tied for second place at 4 touches against apiece, a playoff round-robin was held. The first playoff eliminated only one fencer, with the remaining four again tying and forcing a second playoff. That round resulted in Holt and Tvrzský tying at 1 touch apiece, eliminating the other two fencers.

 Barrage

Bergsland was hit three times, finishing sixth overall in the pool while the other four fencers in the playoff each received two hits to advance to a second playoff.

 Second barrage

Holt and Tvrzský tied for an overall second-place finish in the pool with one touch against apiece (Tvrzský won the bout between the two, but was himself hit by Diana). Becker and Diana placed fourth.

Pool E

The fifth pool also included 8 fencers, but did not require a playoff. The only touch against Alibert came in a double-touch with van Löben Sels.

Pool F

The sixth competition pool was smaller, with only 6 fencers.

Pool G

 Barrage

The Official Report says only that Bosmans defeated Dubourdieu and Schön in the playoff, without giving further detail.

Pool H

 Barrage

The single bout between Rodocanachi and Chalmers to break the tie for third resulted in a win for the Frenchman.

Pool I

The ninth pool was the first of the second day of competition, 18 July.

 Barrage

Mangiarotti was defeated in the three-way playoff for the two remaining advancement spots.

Pool J

Pool K

The eleventh pool was the smallest, with only 5 fencers.

 Barrage

In the playoff for the second and third spots, le Blon and Haig advanced. Okker was eliminated.

Pool L

Pool M

The final pool also had only 5 fencers.

Quarterfinals

Seven of the eight second round pools had 5 fencers, with the eighth having only 4. 2 advanced to the semifinals from each pool.

Quarterfinal 1

 Barrage

Doorman again lost to Stern in the playoff bout.

Quarterfinal 2

 Barrage

Renard won the playoff pool, with no further details given in the Official Report.

Quarterfinal 3

Alibert continued on his perfect streak, winning four more bouts untouched.

 Barrage

Berger won the playoff, defeating von Lobsdorf again.

Quarterfinal 4

 Barrage

Montgomerie won against Gravier and Tvrzský in the three-way playoff for the second semifinal spot.

Quarterfinal 5

Quarterfinal 6

Quarterfinal 7

 Barrage

Labouchere won the three-way playoff for second place and a semifinal spot.

Quarterfinal 8

Semifinals

There were two semifinals, each of 8 fencers. The top 4 in each advanced to the final.

Semifinal 1

Alibert was hit twice, both in double-touches.

Semifinal 2

 Barrage

Final

The final resulted in Alibert taking the championship after again hitting all opponents, though he suffered another pair of double-touches. There was a three-way tie for second place between two Frenchman and Montgomerie of the British team.

 Barrage

The playoff pool for second and third resulted in wins for the two French fencers, completing France's medal sweep in the event.

Results summary

References

Sources
 
 De Wael, Herman. Herman's Full Olympians: "Fencing 1908". Accessed 29 April 2006.

Men's épée